Lafaele Moala (born 22 July 1982) in Tonga is a footballer who plays as an attacking midfielder. He currently plays for Veitongo in the Tonga Major League and the Tonga national football team.

Moala had a long career with Lotoha'apai United.

In 2012 he was appointed assistant coach of the Tonga national under-17 football team.

In 2018 he became a Sport for Development officer with the Just Play program helping disabled people play sport.

International career

International goals
Scores and results list Tonga's goal tally first.

References

1982 births
Living people
Tongan footballers
Tonga international footballers
Association football midfielders
Lotohaʻapai United players
Veitongo FC players